Estella Blain (born Micheline Estellat; 30 March 1930 – 1 January 1982) was a French actress. She appeared in more than twenty films from 1954 to 1981. She played the lead role in Hervé Bromberger's 1954 film Wild Fruit. Blain died by suicide on New Year's Day 1982.

Filmography

References

External links 

1930 births
1982 deaths
French film actresses
1982 suicides
20th-century French women
Suicides in France